Wayne Dehart is an American film, stage and television actor. He is known for playing Mack in the 1993 film A Perfect World.

Career

Dehart appeared on films such as RoboCop 2, They Still Call Me Bruce, Dark Angel, The Stars Fell on Henrietta, The Peanut Butter Falcon and Looper. He also guest-starred in television programs including Walker, Texas Ranger, Tropical Cop Tales (8 episodes), Hap and Leonard, Houston Knights, Prison Break and Breaking Bad (in the episode "Blood Money").

Filmography

References

External links
 

Living people
Year of birth missing (living people)
Place of birth missing (living people)
American male film actors
American male television actors
American male stage actors
20th-century American male actors
21st-century American male actors